Ó Meadhra, Gaelic-Irish surname.

Overview

The Ó Meadhra clan were a sept of the Dal gCais, and the name is most common in the dynasty's homeland of north-east Thomond (nowadays north County Tipperary and adjoining parts of County Clare. The family's home district was centered about Toomevara (O'Meara's tumulus).

Members of the family were physicians and poets to the Earl of Ormond. The last Gaelic-era Chief of the Name was Domhnall Ó Meadhra.

The surname is now anglicised as O'Meara, O'Mara or Meara.

People
 List of people named O'Meara

External links
 http://www.irishtimes.com/ancestor/surname/index.cfm?fuseaction=Go.&UserID=

References

 O'Meara : the descendants of three sons of Ireland, John, Patrick and Michael, who came to New Zealand and settled in Southland and Masterton, John F. Tourelle, Annabelle O'Meara Ltd., Arrowtown, New Zealand, 1998 (National Library of New Zealand P q929.2 OME TOU 1998)
 A historical profile of the O'Meara, O'Mara family: the Dalcassians of Ireland, Irish Families Historical Society, New Jersey, 1993 (Library of Congress CS499 .O62 1993)

Septs of the Dál gCais
Irish families
Surnames
Irish Brehon families
Surnames of Irish origin
Irish-language surnames
Families of Irish ancestry